Aiyura is a genus of moths of the family Crambidae.

Species
Aiyura linoptera Munroe, 1974
Aiyura pyrostrota (Hampson, 1912)

References

Spilomelinae
Crambidae genera
Taxa named by Eugene G. Munroe